Alfred is a masculine given name of English origin, a modern descendant of the Anglo-Saxon name Ælfræd, formed from the Germanic words , meaning "elf", and , meaning "counsel". Its feminine form originating from Romance languages is Alfreda, and diminutives of Alfred include Al, Alf, Alfie, Fred, and Freddy.  After the 11th-century Norman Conquest, many variants of the name emerged, most of which were not carried to the modern day. Today, Alfred is still in regular usage in a number of different regions, especially Great Britain, Africa, Scandinavia, and North America.  This name is one of the few Old English names that came into common use in Europe. Its name day is 3 January both in Norway and Sweden.

Given name

Royalty and politicians
 Alfred the Great (848/849–899), 9th-century king of Wessex
 Alfred Aetheling ( 1012–1036), son of King Ethelred II of England
 Alfred, Duke of Saxe-Coburg and Gotha (1844–1900), second son and fourth child of Queen Victoria of the United Kingdom and Prince Albert of Saxe-Coburg and Gotha
 Alfred, Hereditary Prince of Saxe-Coburg and Gotha (1874–1899), grandson of Queen Victoria and son of Alfred, Duke of Saxe-Coburg and Gotha
 Alfred A. Lama (1899–1984), Italian-American architect and politician
 Alfred Bansard des Bois (1848–1920), French politician
 Alfred Winsor Brown (1885–1938), governor of Guam
 Alfred Burvill, Australian politician
 Alfred Deakin (1856–1919), 2nd prime minister of Australia
 Alfred Joseph Richard de Soysa (1869-1939), Sri Lankan Sinhala landowner and member of the Legislative Council of Ceylon
 Alfred Dregger (1920–2002), German politician
 Alfred Gusenbauer (born 1960), Austrian politician
 Alfred Käärmann (1922–2010), Estonian freedom fighter
 Alfred John King (1859–1920), British politician
 Alfred Kollie (1951–2020), Liberian politician
 Alf Landon (1887–1987), American politician
 Alfred Lecerf (1948–2019), Belgian politician
 Alfred Mtsi (1950/1951–2020), South African politician
 Alfred Mpontshane (born 1952), South African politician
 Al Smith (1873–1944), American statesman
 Alfred Solstad (1884-1973), American farmer and politician
 Alfred Graf von Schlieffen (1833–1913), German field marshal and strategist
 Alfred Thambiayah (1903–unknown), Sri Lankan Tamil businessman and member of parliament

Writers and philosophers 
 Alfred Bester (1913–1987), American science fiction author
 Alfred de Musset (1810–1857), French romantic poet and playwright
 Alfred de Vigny (1797–1863), French romantic poet
 Alfred Jarry (1873–1907), French writer and founder of 'pataphysics
 Alfred Daniel Williams King (1930–1969), American minister and civil rights activist
 Alfred Rosenberg (1893–1946), German Nazi theorist
 Alfred, Lord Tennyson (1809–1892), British poet
 Alfred North Whitehead (1861–1947), English analytic philosopher and mathematician, co-author of Principia Mathematica

Athletes 
 Alfred Aboya (born 1985), Cameroonian basketball player
 Alfred Bloch (born 1877), French Olympic footballer
 Alfred Butch Lee (born 1956), retired Puerto Rican basketball player 
 Alfred Eissler (1896–1954), American football player
 Alfred Albert Joe de Re la Gardiur (1881–1941), Luxembourgish-American wrestler
 Alfred Guth (1908–1996), Austrian-born American water polo player, swimmer, and Olympic modern pentathlete 
 Alf King (born 1941), Australian former footballer 
 Alfred Kipketer (born 1996), Kenyan middle-distance runner and 2013 world youth champion
 Alfred Kivisaar (1953–2021), Estonian badminton player
 Alfred König (1913-1987), Austrian-Turkish Olympic sprinter
 Alfred Kuchevsky (1931–2000), Soviet professional ice hockey player 
 Alfred McCullough (born 1989), American football player
 Alfred Morris (born 1988), American football player
 Alfred Neuland (1895–1966), Estonian weightlifter
 Alfred Puusaag (1897–1951), Estonian weightlifter
 Alf Ramsey (1920–1999), English football manager
 Alfred Schmidt (1898–1972), Estonian weightlifter
 Alfred Skrobisch (1913–1991), American fencer
 Alfred Stöhrmann (1882–1914), German football player
 Alfred Tetteh (born 1975), Ghanaian boxer

Businessmen 
 Alfred O. Deshong (1837-1913), American businessman, philanthropist and art collector
 Alfred Fielding, inventor of Bubble Wrap
 Alfred Ford (born 1950), heir to the Ford family fortune
 Alfred S. Hart (1904–1979), American businessman and banker
 Alfred Herrhausen (1930–1989), German banker 
 Alfred Lindon (–1948), businessman and art collector
 Alfred Lion (1908–1987), American record executive
 Alfred Pisani (born 1939), Maltese businessman and hotelier
 Alfred Douglas Price (1860–1921), African American businessperson and community leader
 Alfred Sung (born 1948), Canadian fashion designer and businessman

Artists and entertainers 
 Alfred Biolek (1934–2021), German entertainer and television producer 
 Alfred Buckham (1879–1956), British photographer
 Alfred Gerald Caplin (1909–1979), American cartoonist and humorist better known as "Al Capp"
 Alfred Eisenstaedt (1898-1995), German-born American photographer and photojournalist
 Alfred Edirimanne (1929-2000), Sri Lankan Sinhala cinema actor and politician
 Alfred Enoch (born 1988), British actor
 Alfred Hill, English comedian better known as "Benny Hill"
 Alfred Hirv (1880–1918), Estonian painter
 Alfred Hitchcock (1899–1980), English film director
 Alfred Koerppen (1926–2022), German organist, composer, and teacher
 Alfred Leslie (1927–2023), American artist and filmmaker
 Alfred Molina (born 1953), British-American actor
 Alfred Momotenko Levitsky (born 1970), Russian-Dutch composer
 Alfred Rasser (1907–1977), Swiss comedian, radio personality, and actor 
 Alfred Ryder (1916–1995), American film, radio, and television actor
 Alfred Schnittke (1934–1998), German-Soviet composer
 Alfred Stieglitz (1864–1946), American photographer and modern art promoter
 Alfred Matthew "Weird Al" Yankovic (born 1959), American parody–comedy musician

Military people 
Alfred Dreyfus (1859-1935), French Jewish artillery officer wrongly accused of treason
Alfred Jodl (1890–1946), German Wehrmacht general who was executed at the Nuremberg trials
Alfred Thayer Mahan (1840–1914), American naval strategist and historian
Alfred C. Markley (1843–1926), American brigadier general
Alfred K. Newman (1924–2019), United States Marine and Navajo code talker
Alfred Saalwächter (1883–1945), German naval officer executed for war crimes
Alfred Trzebinski (1902–1946), German SS physician at several Nazi concentration camps executed for war crimes
Alfred Zeidler (born 1909), German SS concentration camp commandant

Scientists
Alfred L. Elwyn (1804-1884), American physician and pioneer in the training and care of mentally disabled people
Alfred Douglas Hardy (1870–1958), Australian botanist
Alfred Kinsey (1894–1956), American entomologist, zoologist, and human sexuality researcher
Alfred Marshall (1842–1924), English economist
Alfred Newton (1829–1907), English zoologist and ornithologist
Alfred Nobel (1833–1896), Swedish chemist and engineer
Alfred Wilhelm Volkmann (1801–1877), German physiologist, anatomist, and philosopher
Alfred Russel Wallace (1823–1913), British naturalist, explorer, geographer, anthropologist, and biologist
Alfred Wegener (1880–1930), German earth and weather scientist

Fictional characters
 Alfred, alchemist and playable character in Bloodstained: Curse of the Moon
 Alfred, Sartan character from the novel Dragon Wing and other books of The Death Gate Cycle
 Alfred, nickname of the nature spirit Demonreach, a minor character in The Dresden Files
 Alfred, character in the video game series Fatal Fury
 Alfred the Hot Water Bottle, from Australian children's television series Johnson and Friends
 Alfred, major character, a penguin, in the Franco-Belgian comic strip 
 Alfred Alembick, character from King Ottokar's Sceptre 
 Alfred Doolittle, father of Eliza Doolittle in Pygmalion and My Fair Lady
 Alfred Hedgehog, main character of the French-Canadian animated TV series The Mysteries of Alfred Hedgehog
 Alfred F. Jones, personification of the United States of America and leader of the Allied Powers in the anime Hetalia by Hidekaz Himaruya
 Alfred J. Kwak, main character of the eponymous Dutch-Japanese anime television series
 Alfred E. Neuman, mascot and iconic cover boy of Mad magazine
 Alfred Pennyworth, butler to DC Comics superhero Batman
 Alfred, a playable character in the video game Fire Emblem Engage

Other 
Alfred of Sareshel (12th–13th century), English translator
Alfred of Sherborne (10th century), English bishop
Alfred Francis (before 1909-after 1919), Welsh rugby player
Sir Alfred Mehran (born 1946), birth name Mehran Karimi Nasseri, Iranian refugee
Alferd Packer (1842–1907), American cannibal
Alfred Westou, (11th century), English priest and relic collector
Alfred Worden (1932–2020), American astronaut, business executive, and author

Surname
 Mike Alfred, a South African poet

See also
 Alfredo

References

Old English given names
English masculine given names
French masculine given names
German masculine given names
Dutch masculine given names
Estonian masculine given names
Faroese masculine given names
Scandinavian masculine given names
Swedish masculine given names
Danish masculine given names
Norwegian masculine given names

cs:Alfréd
es:Alfredo (nombre)
eo:Alfredo
fr:Alfréd
gl:Alfredo
it:Alfredo
la:Alfredus
hu:Alfréd
ja:アルフレッド
scn:Arfredu (nomu)
sk:Alfréd